Mundhal Kalan is a village in the Bhiwani district of the Indian state of Haryana. , the village had 503 households with a population of 3,034 of which 1,593 were male and 1,441 female.
Khurd and Kalan Persian language word which means small and Big respectively when two villages have same name then it is distinguished as Kalan means Big and Khurd means Small with Village Name.

References

Villages in Bhiwani district